Satya Saha (1935–1999) was a Bangladeshi music director of Indian origin. He scored music for 119 films. The following is a list of films he scored:

1960s

1970s

1980s

1990s

2000s

2010s

2020s

Televesion dramas

Background score only

Non-film albums

References

External links

Sources
 

Discographies of Bangladeshi artists